The following highways are numbered 442:

Canada
Manitoba Provincial Road 442

Japan
 Japan National Route 442

United States
  Florida State Road 442
  Louisiana Highway 442
  Maryland Route 442
  New York State Route 442
  Pennsylvania Route 442
  Puerto Rico Highway 442
  Farm to Market Road 442